Paddock is a district of Huddersfield, West Yorkshire, England.

The Paddock Ward had a population of 14,875 according to the 2001 Census.

Paddock's secondary school, Royds Hall, was attended by the former Prime Minister of the United Kingdom Harold Wilson. A 2017 Ofsted report found that the school had over 1,100 students.

Notable people
 Robert Baldick, French literature scholar
 Willie Watson, English cricketer went to school in Paddock and played for the Paddock cricket team

See also
Listed buildings in Huddersfield (Greenhead Ward)

References

Colne Valley
Areas of Huddersfield